Soulmates Never Die (Live in Paris 2003) is a live DVD by English alternative rock band Placebo, recorded on 18 October 2003 at the Palais Omnisports de Paris-Bercy in Paris. It is the first DVD by Placebo that was released mainstream and made available worldwide. The DVD was released in the UK on 15 March 2004 and in the US and Canada on 29 June 2004.

Reception
Tim DiGravina of AllMusic wrote that "the film is an intensely edgy portrait of Placebo as a trio of arena rock gods [...] [Brian Molko's] voice is still in fine form, his and Stefan Olsdal's guitars are as fierce and crunchy as ever, and Steve Hewitt's drumming is spot-on. Every one of the 21 songs is tackled with conviction and passion. Indeed, most of the songs sound fuller and better here than on their respective albums."

Track listing
"Bulletproof Cupid"
"Allergic (To Thoughts of Mother Earth)"
"Every You Every Me"
"Bionic"
"Protège-Moi" (French version of "Protect Me From What I Want")
"Plasticine"
"The Bitter End"
"Soulmates" (Heavier version of "Sleeping with Ghosts")
"Black-Eyed"
"I'll Be Yours"
"Special Needs"
"English Summer Rain"
"Without You I'm Nothing"
"This Picture"
"Special K"
"Taste in Men"
"Slave to the Wage"
"Peeping Tom"
"Pure Morning"
"Centerfolds"
"Where Is My Mind?" (Pixies cover featuring Frank Black)

Features
Sleeping with Ghosts documentary: A 25-minute tour documentary of the band as they tour the world to promote their album. Includes backstage footage, parties and the band just hanging out.
Chicks with Dicks: Hidden in the "Audio" section of the DVD is an old live performance of "Where Is My Mind?", a Pixies cover, while the band is dressed-up in drag. To view this, one is to go to the 'Audio' section, highlight 'Stereo' and push the 'up' key, after which a French flag should appear. After pressing 'OK' the feature should begin playing.
Brian's B12's Tour: This is a humorous scene in which the cameras are focused on Brian. To view this, one is to go to the DVD 'main menu', highlight 'set list' and press the 'up' key, after which a French flag should appear. After pressing 'OK' the feature should begin playing.

Personnel
Brian Molko – guitars, vocals, bass, keyboards, effects, harmonica, percussion
Stefan Olsdal – bass, guitars, keyboards, backing vocals
Steve Hewitt – drums, percussion
Bill Lloyd – bass, guitars, keyboards
Xavior Roide – keyboards, percussion, backing vocals

Certifications

References

External links
 

Placebo (band) video albums
Live video albums
2004 video albums
2004 live albums